Nicolas Auguste de La Baume, marquis de Monterevel, was born in Paris 23 December 1645  and died in Paris 11 October 1716. He was a French 17th and 18th century military commander, and Maréchal de France. He was also known by the title maréchal de Montrevel.

Biography 
He was raised at court.

Army service
He served in high office in the War of Devolution, the Dutch Wars, War of the Reunions, War of the League of Augsburg (Nine Years'War) and the War in the Cevennes. He was made governor of Guyenne in 1716.

Personal life
He married three times and had a single son by his second wife.

References
Details translated from Nicolas Auguste de La Baume on French Wikipedia

1645 births
1716 deaths